Faustino Hernán Asprilla Hinestroza (born 10 November 1969) is a Colombian former professional footballer who played as forward or winger. Most notably played for Parma, Newcastle United and the Colombia national team.

Club career

Early years
After starting out playing football with local team Carlos Sarmiento Lora School, Asprilla started his professional career in 1988 for the Colombian team Cúcuta Deportivo at the age of 18 for a year before transferring to Atlético Nacional. He scored 35 goals in 78 games, which brought him to the attention of several Italian clubs. Parma won the race to sign him for US$10.9 million in 1992.

Parma
In his first season at Parma, Asprilla scored some important goals, including a 27-yard second-half free-kick which helped Parma defeat Milan 1–0, ending the Italian champions' unbeaten streak at 58 matches. It was at Parma Asprilla arguably enjoyed his greatest club success. Asprilla was part of the Parma squad which won its first international tournament, the 1992–93 European Cup Winners' Cup, scoring four goals in eight matches. It was his brace in Spain that rallied the Italian team to a 2–1 victory over Atlético Madrid in the semi-final. However, an injury meant he was an unused substitute as Parma defeated Belgian club Royal Antwerp 3–1 in the final.

In early 1994, Asprilla was part of the Parma side that defeated Milan 2–0 at the San Siro to overturn a 1–0 first-leg deficit and claim the 1993 European Super Cup.

Also in the 1993–94 season, Parma reached a second Cup Winners' Cup final. However, a 0–1 defeat to Arsenal meant they would not retain their trophy.

In 1994–95, Parma again reached the final of a major European competition as they faced Italian compatriots Juventus in the final of the UEFA Cup. Asprilla was instrumental in Parma's run to the final, with three goals over two legs in the semi-final against Bayer Leverkusen. In the final itself, Asprilla was in the starting XI for both legs as Parma defeated Juventus 2–1 on aggregate.

At the start of the 1995–96 season, Asprilla found himself out of head coach Nevio Scala's plans. In February 1996, after making only six appearances in the opening five months of the season, Asprilla joined English Premier League leaders Newcastle United for a £6.7 million transfer fee.

During his first spell at Parma, Asprilla scored 25 goals in 84 Serie A appearances. He is considered one of the greatest players of Parma's successful period in the 1990s. In his three full seasons with the club, Parma finished third, fifth and third in Serie A. The club also reached a European final in each of those seasons, as well as the 1994–95 Coppa Italia final. He also won the UEFA Cup Winners' Cup in 1992–93, as well as a runners-up medal in 1993–94 edition of the tournament, the European Super Cup in 1993, and the UEFA Cup in 1994–95 and 1998–99. In 1993, he was also ranked by FIFA as the sixth-best player in the world in the FIFA World Player of the Year award.

Newcastle United
Parma sold Asprilla to English Premier League side Newcastle United for £6.7 million in February 1996, with "Tino", as the fans nicknamed him, appearing at St James' Park to finalise the move during a snowstorm, dressed in a fur coat.
At the time, Newcastle were ahead of Manchester United in the Premier League, although their lead at the top of the table was narrowing. Asprilla's arrival on Tyneside came just months after earlier media reports of a move to England, with Leeds United being linked with his signature.

Asprilla made his league debut in Newcastle's 2–1 win over Middlesbrough at the Riverside Stadium on 10 February 1996, coming on as a second-half substitute with the score 1–0 in Middlesbrough's favour. He made an immediate impact, creating the assist for Newcastle's equaliser. However, his time on Tyneside was blighted by inconsistency and off-field incidents, and Asprilla was blamed as one of the reasons Newcastle would go on to concede the 1995–96 Premier League title to eventual winners Manchester United.

Asprilla's second season for Newcastle ended with the club finishing in second place once again, behind Manchester United. His role was largely reduced to substitute appearances, although he retained his best performances for the club's UEFA Cup campaign, scoring five goals. His celebration of the goal he scored against Metz, whereby he removed his shirt and swung it from a corner flag, resulted in Asprilla being given a yellow card, meaning a suspension from Newcastle's next UEFA Cup match against Monaco.

The 1997–98 season was Asprilla's last for Newcastle. With the sale of striker Les Ferdinand to Tottenham Hotspur and a serious injury to Alan Shearer during the pre-season, Asprilla was preferred as first-choice striker alongside the young, inexperienced Jon Dahl Tomasson. Newcastle's second-place league finish the season before meant they qualified for the 1997–98 UEFA Champions League; Asprilla started the first game against Barcelona and scored a hat-trick in a 3–2 win. These would turn out to be his last goals for the club. By the end of January 1998, with Newcastle struggling in the league and eliminated from the Champions League, Asprilla's time at Newcastle came to an end. He was sold back to Parma for £6 million, having scored a total of nine goals in 48 Premier League appearances and nine goals in 11 European matches.

Return to Parma
In his second spell at Parma, Asprilla won his second UEFA Cup, coming on as a substitute as Parma defeated Marseille in the final.

Palmeiras
Asprilla played in the successful Palmeiras team in the 1999 and 2000 seasons. He won both the Rio-São Paulo Tournament and the Brazilian Champions Cup in 2000.

Later career and Darlington link
Although his brief time with Palmeiras saw the team achieve success, for Asprilla personally his time there marked the beginning of a pattern of short, relatively unproductive stays with various clubs across various countries, including Brazil, Mexico, Chile, Colombia and Argentina.

During a time which was generally low-key, he appeared in the public eye again in 2002 amid reports he had been approached by English Division Three side Darlington. Darlington successfully appealed an initial work permit refusal and had offered around £17,000 per week plus 20% of gate receipts, a car and a rent-free flat. Chairman George Reynolds considered they were friends and in fact paraded Asprilla in front of 5,163 fans before Darlington's 2–0 win over Carlisle United on 27 August, believing the intended two-year contract was good as signed. However, it was reported that after Asprilla stalled on taking a medical on 29 August, in the early hours of 30 August, Asprilla caught a flight from Newcastle Airport to the Middle East, apparently to accept a more lucrative contract offer. Reynolds described himself as "absolutely gutted" by the snub, complaining Asprilla "did not even have the decency to say goodbye" and said he would never talk to him again. This was the second time Darlington was snubbed by a high-profile ex-Newcastle player that summer, the first being Paul Gascoigne.

The identity of the Middle East club has never been revealed.

International career

Summary
Asprilla scored 20 goals in 57 matches for Colombia from 1993 to 2001 and played for his country at the 1994 and 1998 FIFA World Cups. Asprilla was expected to be one of the top players of the 1994 tournament, but failed to score a single goal as Colombia was eliminated in the first round.

1992 Summer Olympics
Asprilla was a member of the Colombian team at the 1992 Summer Olympics in Barcelona where the team was eliminated in the first round following losses to Spain (4–0) and Egypt (3–4) and a draw with Qatar (1–1).

1993 Copa America
In the 1993 Copa América, held in Ecuador, Colombia finished third overall. After topping Group C with a 2–1 win over Mexico and draws with Bolivia (1–1) and Argentina (1–1), Colombia defeated Uruguay 1–1 (5–3 on penalties) before losing 0–0 (6–5 on penalties) to Argentina in the semi-final, the eventual tournament winners. In the match for third place, Colombia defeated hosts Ecuador 1–0 to claim third place. Asprilla did not score in the tournament.

1994 FIFA World Cup
Asprilla was part of the Colombian team which demolished Argentina 5–0 in a World Cup Qualifier match in Buenos Aires in 1993, where Asprilla scored twice. Colombia finished undefeated in the South American qualifying group. Entering the 1994 World Cup, there were high expectations for Colombia as a dark horse favourite to win the tournament with a squad that included such notable players as Carlos Valderrama, Freddy Rincón and Asprilla. However, with one win and two losses, Colombia finished at the bottom of their group and was eliminated after the first round. Asprilla himself had a disappointing tournament, failing to score, and left the tournament before the group stage had concluded.

1995 Copa América
In the 1995 Copa América, held and won by Uruguay, Colombia again finished third. Colombia started out by finishing third in Group B with a 1–1 draw with Peru (Asprilla scored the goal), a 1–0 win over Ecuador and a 0–3 loss to Brazil. The nation then went on to defeat Paraguay 5–4 on penalties after a 1–1 draw in the quarter-finals before losing to Uruguay 2–0 in the semi-final. In the third place match, Colombia faced the United States, which Colombia easily defeated 4–1 with Asprilla scoring one of the Colombians' four goals in the match.

1998 FIFA World Cup
In the 1998 FIFA World Cup, held in France, expectations were again high for Colombia and Asprilla remained in the team. However, again Colombia was eliminated in the first round following one win and two losses. Asprilla was dismissed from the team after complaining to reporters about the head coach's decision to substitute him near the end of Colombia's opening loss against Romania.

In 2001, at age 32, Asprilla retired from international football.

Retirement
In July 2009, Asprilla officially retired from top flight football following a retirement match in Medellín, Colombia. Although this marks his official retirement date, he had not been actively employed by a professional side in around five years.

In 2008, he was arrested for allegedly firing a machine gun at security forces near his farm in Colombia. He was placed under house arrest on charges of weapons possession and criminal damage. He has appeared in various Colombian Reality Shows, such as Desafio 2005 and Nomadas.

He made a return to St James' Park on 22 January 2011 appearing on the pitch at half time during Newcastle United's Premier League home match against Tottenham Hotspur and attended a charity dinner in Gateshead that evening, alongside Les Ferdinand and Peter Beardsley, where he spoke of his affection for the Newcastle fans.

In early 2013, Asprilla was linked with a return to his former club Newcastle. Asprilla spoke of performing a coaching role with the youth squad as well as developing a special role in introducing young talent into the academy from his homeland Colombia. His intention is to give Colombians a chance to showcase their skills in European/English football, based on the sheer amount of talent that has come from Colombia in recent years.

Asprilla played in former Magpies goalkeeper Steve Harper's testimonial match on 11 September 2013 against A.C. Milan Glorie. He had a header disallowed for offside before the Italians won 2–1 on penalties.

In September 2014, it was revealed Asprilla was preparing to launch a range of flavoured condoms in Colombia. In 2020, he sold the products at a special promotional price in order to ease the strains of the COVID-19 pandemic in his home country.

Asprilla revealed in 2019 that a hitman wanted to murder Paraguay goalkeeper José Luis Chilavert after both players were sent off in Colombia's 2–1 defeat during a 1998 FIFA World Cup qualifier in 1997.

Style of play
Regarded as one of the greatest Colombian players of all time, Asprilla was capable of playing as a forward, as a striker, as a centre-forward, as a second striker, or even as a creative, playmaking attacking midfielder in the number ten role. Though never a prolific goalscorer, he was a quick, agile and skilful player known for his flair, creativity, technique, power, acceleration, and pace, as well as his eye for goal and ability to create chances and score spectacular goals with either foot; moreover, he was an accurate free kick taker.

Former playing colleague, Robbie Elliott described Asprilla's playing style: "There were reasons behind everyone Kevin [Keegan] signed. With Tino it was that unpredictability, he just unlocked teams. His nickname was the octopus because his legs were everywhere and you literally had no idea what he was going to do."

Despite his talent and unpredictability, he was known for being inconsistent, as well as temperamental and controversial, both on and off the field. He was also known for his somersault then double-fist-pump goal celebration. Due to his long limbs, he was given the nickname il polipo ("the octopus," in Italian), during his time in Serie A, as well as cobra, due to his playing ability.

Career statistics

Club

International
Scores and results list Colombia's goal tally first, score column indicates score after each Asprilla goal.

Honours

Club
Atlético Nacional
Categoría Primera A: 1991
Copa Interamericana: 1990

Parma
Coppa Italia: 1998–99
UEFA Cup: 1994–95, 1998–99
European Cup Winners' Cup: 1992–93
European Super Cup: 1993

Palmeiras
Torneio Rio – São Paulo: 2000
Copa dos Campeões: 2000

References

External links

International statistics at rsssf

Interview with FourFourTwo

1969 births
Living people
Sportspeople from Valle del Cauca Department
Association football midfielders
Colombian footballers
Colombian expatriate footballers
Colombia international footballers
1993 Copa América players
1995 Copa América players
1997 Copa América players
1994 FIFA World Cup players
1998 FIFA World Cup players
2000 CONCACAF Gold Cup players
Cúcuta Deportivo footballers
Atlético Nacional footballers
Parma Calcio 1913 players
Newcastle United F.C. players
Sociedade Esportiva Palmeiras players
Fluminense FC players
Atlante F.C. footballers
Universidad de Chile footballers
Estudiantes de La Plata footballers
Cortuluá footballers
Olympic footballers of Colombia
Footballers at the 1992 Summer Olympics
Categoría Primera A players
Serie A players
Premier League players
Campeonato Brasileiro Série A players
Chilean Primera División players
Liga MX players
Argentine Primera División players
Expatriate footballers in Argentina
Expatriate footballers in Brazil
Expatriate footballers in Chile
Expatriate footballers in England
Expatriate footballers in Italy
Expatriate footballers in Mexico
Colombian expatriate sportspeople in Argentina
Colombian expatriate sportspeople in Chile
Colombian expatriate sportspeople in Brazil
Colombian expatriate sportspeople in Mexico
Colombian expatriate sportspeople in England
Colombian expatriate sportspeople in Italy
UEFA Cup winning players
Colombian people of African descent